Kenneth Okonkwo (born November 6, 1968) is a Nigerian actor, lawyer and politician, known for his role in the movie Living in Bondage as Andy Okeke.

Career 
In 2013 he won the African Movie Academy Award on a Special Recognition of Pillars of Nollywood.
2015 he was given a special recognition award by the organisers of the City People Entertainment Awards for his contribution to the growth of entertainment in Nigeria.

Filmography

See also
9th Africa Movie Academy Awards

References

Living people
Nigerian male film actors
University of Nigeria alumni
University of Lagos alumni
Igbo male actors
Nigerian actor-politicians
1968 births
Nigerian Law School alumni
Nigerian politicians
20th-century Nigerian actors
21st-century Nigerian actors
20th-century births